Chen Haibin (born 22 May 1984) is a Chinese cross-country skier. He competed in the men's sprint event at the 2006 Winter Olympics.

References

External links
 
 
 
 
 

1984 births
Living people
Chinese male cross-country skiers
Olympic cross-country skiers of China
Cross-country skiers at the 2006 Winter Olympics
Place of birth missing (living people)
Asian Games medalists in biathlon
Biathletes at the 2007 Asian Winter Games
Biathletes at the 2011 Asian Winter Games
Asian Games bronze medalists for China
Medalists at the 2011 Asian Winter Games